Nuwara Eliya electoral district was an electoral district of Sri Lanka between August 1947 and July 1977. The district was named after the City of Nuwara Eliya in Nuwara Eliya District, Central Province. The 1978 Constitution of Sri Lanka introduced the proportional representation electoral system for electing members of Parliament. The existing 160 mainly single-member electoral districts were replaced with 22 multi-member electoral districts. Nuwara Eliya electoral district was replaced by the Nuwara Eliya multi-member electoral district at the 1989 general elections, the first under the proportional representation system, Nuwara Eliya continues to be a polling division of the multi-member electoral district.

Members of Parliament
Key

Elections

1947 Parliamentary General Election
Results of the 1st parliamentary election held between 23 August 1947 and 20 September 1947:

1952 Parliamentary General Election
Results of the 2nd parliamentary election held between 24 May 1952 and 30 May 1952:

1956 Parliamentary General Election
Results of the 3rd parliamentary election held between 5 April 1956 and 10 April 1956:

1960 (March) Parliamentary General Election
Results of the 4th parliamentary election held on 19 March 1960:

1960 (July) Parliamentary General Election
Results of the 5th parliamentary election held on 20 July 1960:

1965 Parliamentary General Election
Results of the 6th parliamentary election held on 22 March 1965:

1970 Parliamentary General Election
Results of the 7th parliamentary election held on 27 May 1970:

1972 Parliamentary By-Election
Results of the parliamentary by-election held on 9 October 1972:

References

Former electoral districts of Sri Lanka
Politics of Nuwara Eliya District